AMC may refer to:

Film and television
 AMC Theatres, an American movie theater chain
 AMC Networks, an American entertainment company
 AMC (TV channel)
 AMC+, streaming service
 AMC Networks International, an entertainment company
 AMC (Asian TV channel), TV channel
 AMC (European TV channel), TV channel
 AMC (African and Middle Eastern TV channel), TV channel

Other
 Australian Multiplex Cinemas
 All My Children, a TV series

Education
 Academia Mexicana de Ciencias, a Mexican education organization
 American Mathematics Competitions
 Andhra Medical College, Andhra Pradesh, India
 Archif Menywod Cymru, Welsh organisation also known as Women's Archive Wales
 Army Medical College, Punjab, Pakistan
 Australian Maritime College, Launceston, Tasmania
 Australian Mathematics Competition
 Ayub Medical College, Khyber-Pakhtunkhwa, Pakistan
 AMC Institutions, Bangalore, India

Finance
 Ameriquest Mortgage Company
 Association management company
 Agricultural Mortgage Corporation
 Annual Management Charge see Total expense ratio
 Asset management company
 Actively managed certificates, a type of exchange-traded product
 China Asset Management, or ChinaAMC

Medicine
 Advance market commitment, a government guarantee to buy a medicine if developed
 Amoxicillin, an antibiotic
 Amylmetacresol, an antiseptic used in throat lozenges
 Arab Medical Center, Amman, Jordan
 Arthrogryposis multiplex congenita, a congenital disorder
 Atlantic Modal Cluster, a set of haplotypes
 Australian Medical Council
 Academic Medical Center, the University of Amsterdam hospital in the Netherlands

Military 
 AMC 34, a French tank used prior to World War II
 AMC 35, a French tank used during World War II
 Air Materiel Command of the U.S. Air Force
 Air Mobility Command, a major command of the U.S. Air Force
 Allied Military Currency, used during World War II
 Armed Merchant Cruiser, a type of UK Royal Navy ship
 Australian Maritime College, Launceston, Tasmania
 United States Army Materiel Command, a command of the U.S. Army

Music
 Adelaide Music Collective, founded by David Day (broadcaster)
 American Music Center, a non-profit organization
 American Music Club, a band
 Asian Music Circle, an organisation promoting Indian and other Asian art and culture
 Asian Music Circuit, a charitable organization
 Asian Music Chart, part of Official Charts Company

People
 A.M.C, British Drum-and-bass DJ and producer

Transport
 Air Malta, ICAO code AMC
 Amalgamated Motor Cycles Ltd, a British motorcycle manufacturer
 AMC Airlines
 American Motors Corporation, an American automobile company

Telecommunications
 Adaptive modulation and coding, in wireless communications
 AMC-3, a communications satellite launched 1997
 AMC-18, a communications satellite launched 2006
 Advanced Mezzanine Card, a telecommunications specification
 Albanian Mobile Communications, a telecommunications company

Other uses
 7-Amino-4-methylcoumarin, a fluorochrome
 Advanced Micro Computers, a former joint-venture of AMD and Siemens
 African Minifootball Cup
 Agartala Municipal Council, a governing body of Agartala, India
 Ahmadiyya Muslim Community, a denomination in Islam
 Ahmedabad Municipal Corporation, a governing body of Ahmedabad, India
 Alaska Milk Corporation, a Philippine dairy company owned by FrieslandCampina
 Alexander Maconochie Centre, a prison in the Australian Capital Territory
 AMC – Andrzej M. Chołdzyński, a Polish studio for architecture from Warsaw
 American Mideast Conference, a NAIA athletic conference operating 1949–2012
 American Midwest Conference, a NAIA athletic conference established in 1998
 American Muslim Council, a religious organization in the United States
 Appalachian Mountain Club
 Archive of Modern Conflict, a British publisher
 Arizona-Mexico Commission, a non-profit
 Australian Marine Complex, a naval maintenance complex in Western Australia
 Australian Multicultural Council, an Australian Government body